The women's rhythmic group all-around competition at the 2012 Summer Olympics was held at the Wembley Arena from 9–12 August.

Competition format

The competition consisted of a qualification round and a final round. The top eight teams in the qualification round advanced to the final. In each round, the teams performed two routines (one with balls, one with ribbons and hoops), with the scores added to give a total.

Qualification results

Final results

References

Gymnastics at the 2012 Summer Olympics
2012
2012 in women's gymnastics
Women's events at the 2012 Summer Olympics